Jan Roháč z Dubé (died 9 September 1437 in Prague) was a Bohemian Hussite general who originated in the Bohemian gentry. 

Following the death of Jan Žižka, he became Master of Orphans, a radical Hussite sect. He survived the Battle of Lipany in 1434 and, in 1437, he retreated with his last remaining disciples to his small castle Sion in what is now the Czech Republic. There he was besieged and after four months the castle defenses were successfully breached by the combined efforts of Bohemian troops under Hynek Ptáček and Hungarian troops led by Michael Ország. Roháč was hanged on Emperor Sigismund's order three days later in Prague.

External links 
 

Czech military leaders
Czech revolutionaries
Hussite people
1437 deaths
People executed by Hungary by hanging
People executed by the Holy Roman Empire
Executed Czech people
15th-century executions
Year of birth unknown